Floriana Bertone (born ) is an Italian female volleyball player. She is part of the Italy women's national volleyball team.

She participated in the 2014 FIVB Volleyball World Grand Prix.
On club level she played for Il Bisonte San Casciano in 2014.

References

External links
 Profile at FIVB.org

1992 births
Living people
Italian women's volleyball players
Place of birth missing (living people)
Mediterranean Games gold medalists for Italy
Mediterranean Games medalists in volleyball
Competitors at the 2013 Mediterranean Games